Pauline Dohn Rudolph (1865-1934) was an American painter. She was also a founder of the Chicago Palette Club.

Early years
Dohn was born in Chicago in 1865. She studied art at the Chicago Academy of Fine Arts and then at the Pennsylvania Academy of Fine Arts in Philadelphia where she studied with Thomas Eakins and Thomas Anschutz.  This was followed by a move to Paris where she enrolled in the Académie Julian and studied with Boulanger and Lefebvre.

Career
Returning to Chicago she founded and exhibited at the Palette Club before accepting a teaching position at the Chicago Academy of Fine Arts.

Dohn exhibited at least four works at the 1893 World's Columbian Exposition in Chicago—the mural Industrial Arts for the Reception Room of the Illinois State Building, and paintings in the Palace of Fine Arts and The Woman's Building.

Later life
Dohn married Franklin Rudolph in 1901, with whom she had three children. She moved to California in 1933, where she died on June 19, 1934.

See also
List of American painters exhibited at the 1893 World's Columbian Exposition

Gallery

References

External links
 

1865 births
1934 deaths
Artists from Chicago
19th-century American painters
20th-century American painters
American women painters
19th-century American women artists
20th-century American women artists
Pennsylvania Academy of the Fine Arts alumni
Académie Julian alumni
School of the Art Institute of Chicago faculty
Students of Thomas Eakins
American women academics